Farés Mehenni (born 12 September 2002) is an Algerian professional footballer who plays as a defender for Nancy.

Early life 
Mehenni was born in Paris, first playing football in Île-de-France at Garges-lès-Gonesse. He later played for AAS Sarcelles and Reims, before joining Nancy in 2017.

Club career 
After playing with the first team ahead of the 2021–22 season, Mehenni made his professional debut for Nancy on 24 July 2021, replacing Lamine Cissé in the final minutes of a 2–1 Ligue 2 away defeat to Pau.

International career 
Mehenni is of Algerian descent, and was selected for the UNAF qualification tournament for the 2021 Africa U-20 Cup of Nations with the Algeria national under-20 team.

References

External links

2002 births
Living people
Footballers from Paris
Algerian footballers
Algeria youth international footballers
French footballers
French sportspeople of Algerian descent
Association football defenders
Stade de Reims players
AS Nancy Lorraine players
Championnat National 3 players
Ligue 2 players